Roberto 'Roby' Rolfo (born 23 March 1980) is an Italian former professional motorcycle road racer. He had his best season in 2003, when he finished in second place in the 250cc World Championship.

Career
Rolfo was born in Turin, Italy.

250cc World Championship
Rolfo began competing in the Grand Prix series with a few wildcard entries in 1996. After finishing in third place in the European championship in 1997, Rolfo competed in his first full World Championship season in 1998. In his first season his best result was fifth place in Argentina, and in 1999 it was again a fifth, at Catalunya. In 2000 he finished no higher than sixth.

2001 proved to be a breakthrough year. Riding for the Safilo Aprilia team, he finished fourth in the championship, ahead of the factory Aprilias Riccardo Chiarello and Jeremy McWilliams. After scoring points in the first four races, he scored three podiums in the next four (second at Mugello and Donington Park and 3rd at Catalunya). He only failed to score points twice all season.

In 2002 he raced for the Fortuna-Honda Gresini team. He scored five second places, three of them behind countryman and champion Marco Melandri. He only failed to score points once, earning him third place overall in the world championship.

Following Fausto Gresini's decision to concentrate in MotoGP class in 2003, Rolfo switched to a team run by Daniel Amatrian, albeit main sponsor Fortuna remains. He went better both in terms of race results and championship finish. He was victorious at Sachsenring and Phillip Island en route to finishing the season in second overall. He went into the final race knowing that victory would give him the title unless Manuel Poggiali finished second, but he was down in seventh. He did beat the series' winningest rider that year, Toni Elías, into third overall however.

2004 was not a success by these standards. Rolfo won in Spain, but was not on the podium again, finishing only eighth overall.

MotoGP
After making no advance in 2004, Rolfo moved up to MotoGP for 2005, with the D'Antin Ducati team. Running year-old machinery, on Dunlop tyres which were perceived to be inferior and which the bike was not designed around, and with no teammate, decent results were always going to be hard to come by. He scored points in nine races, with a best of tenth, to finish 18th overall in the championship.

Superbike World Championship
He raced for Caracchi Ducati team on a privateer bike. He started strongly, with a fifth place and two seventh places in the first four races, but only managed two top ten finishes (both at Monza) in the following five rounds, and ultimately finished 16th overall.

For  he joined the HANNspree Ten Kate Honda team, alongside  champion James Toseland. Rolfo managed a career-best fourth place at Monza and Silverstone and finished 8th overall, but was overshadowed by his teammate's championship win.

He missed the Monza round due to injury. Axed for 2009, he scored a second-row grid position at contract time at Magny-Cours. He was also quick in the rain at Donington before a rash attempt at overtaking Leon Haslam eliminated him and took Haslam out of contention.

For 2009, he joined the new-to-WSBK Stiggy Racing Honda team, alongside Haslam, but lost the seat following the Qatar round of the season to John Hopkins.

Career statistics

Grand Prix motorcycle racing

By season

By class

Races by year
(key) (Races in bold indicate pole position) (Races in italics indicate fastest lap)

Superbike World Championship

Races by year
(key) (Races in bold indicate pole position) (Races in italics indicate fastest lap)

Supersport World Championship

Races by year
(key) (Races in bold indicate pole position) (Races in italics indicate fastest lap)

 * Season still in progress.

References

External links

  

1980 births
Living people
Sportspeople from Turin
Italian motorcycle racers
250cc World Championship riders
Pramac Racing MotoGP riders
Superbike World Championship riders
Moto2 World Championship riders
Supersport World Championship riders
MotoGP World Championship riders